Greenville High School (GHS) is a high school in Greenville, Ohio, USA. GHS is the only high school in the Greenville City Schools district. Greenville participates in the Miami Valley League (MVL).

Ohio High School Athletic Association State Championships
 Girls' softball - 2007

Alumni
 Matt Light, three-time Super Bowl winner as offensive tackle with the New England Patriots. His high school number, 87, has been retired.
 Jack Baldschun, nine-year Major League baseball pitcher for the Philadelphia Phillies, Cincinnati Reds and San Diego Padres.
 Ed Olwine, three-year Major League Baseball pitcher for the Atlanta Braves.

References

External links
 District website

Buildings and structures in Greenville, Ohio
High schools in Darke County, Ohio
Public high schools in Ohio